Built in 1821, DeVault Tavern is a two-story brick building in the federal style in Jonesborough, Tennessee with a lower and upper front porch. The porch is of wood construction and has a small pediment.  A two-story ell extends to the rear and some enclosure has been made on the side porch of the ell. The brick is Flemish bond and the house rests on a limestone foundation. The windows are original, as are the shutters.  Detail under the eaves and around the porch is hand-carved and gives the appearance of a honeycomb;  this detail is found in several early houses in Washington County. A log slave cabin remains in the back yard and the original brick spring house is just across the road from the DeVault Tavern. This structure stands on the Great Stage Road between Abingdon, Virginia, and Knoxville, Tennessee.  Andrew Jackson stayed at the tavern, as did General John Hunt Morgan of the Confederate Army on the night before his death.

References

External links

Commercial buildings on the National Register of Historic Places in Tennessee
Federal architecture in Tennessee
Buildings and structures completed in 1821
Buildings and structures in Washington County, Tennessee
National Register of Historic Places in Washington County, Tennessee
Slave cabins and quarters in the United States